Nematinae is a subfamily of sawflies belonging to the family Tenthredinidae. It contains over 1250 described species in ~40 genera. Members of this subfamily feed on a wide range of plants (over twenty plant families have been recorded as hosts) and employ a wide range of feeding habits, both internally and externally, on their host plants.

Most groups of insects tend to have maximum numbers of species in the tropics and decrease towards the poles. The Nematinae reverse this trend, with the highest number probably occurring in the boreal forest zone. The reason is not fully understood but could be because of the abundance of species of willow (Salix species) in the region. In 2014, species feeding on willow, in the genera Eupontania, Phyllocolpa, Pontania and Tubpontania, were placed in the genus Euura, reflecting advances in the understanding of their phylogeny.

Genera
Genera include:

 Adelomos Ross, 1935
 Anhoplocampa Wei, 1998
 Anoplonyx Marlatt, 1896
 Armenocampus Zinovjev, 2000
 Caulocampus Rohwer, 1912
 Cladius Illiger, 1807
 Craterocercus Rohwer, 1911
 Dinematus Lacourt, 2006
 Dineura Dahlbom, 1835
 Endophytus Hering, 1934
 Euura Newman, 1837
 Fagineura Vikberg & Zinovjev, 2000
 Fallocampus Wong, 1977
 Hemichroa Stephens, 1835
 Hoplocampa Hartig, 1837
 Katsujia Togashi, 1964
 Kerita Ross, 1937
 Megadineura Malaise, 1931
 Mesoneura Hartig, 1837
 Monocellicampa Wei, 1998
 Moricella Rohwer, 1916
 Nematinus Rohwer, 1911
 Nematus Panzer, 1801 (willow sawflies)
 Neodineura Taeger, 1989
 Nescianeura Lacourt, 2006
 Pachynematus Konow, 1890
 Platycampus Schiødte, 1839
 Pristiphora Latreille, 1810
 Pseudodineura Konow, 1885
 Renonerva Wei & Nie, 1998
 Stauronematus Benson, 1953
 Susana Rohwer & Middleton, 1932
 Zhuangzhoua Liu, Niu & Wei 2017
 † Driocampus Zhang & Zhang, 1990
 † Emprionopsis Zhang Junfeng, Sun Bo & Zhang Xiyu, 1994
 † Eohemichroa Zhelochovtzev & Rasnitsyn, 1973
 † Florissantinus Zhelochovtzev & Rasnitsyn, 1973
 † Leptocampus Zhang Junfeng, Sun Bo & Zhang Xiyu, 1994
 † Phthonocampus Zhang Junfeng, Sun Bo & Zhang Xiyu, 1994

References

External links

 
 

Tenthredinidae